Przewóz  (German Przewoz, from 1874 Lindenhof) is a village in the administrative district of Gmina Chmielno, within Kartuzy County, Pomeranian Voivodeship, in northern Poland.

For details of the history of the region, see History of Pomerania.

The village has a population of 343.

References

Villages in Kartuzy County